A jacket is a garment for the upper body, usually extending below the hips. A jacket typically has sleeves, and fastens in the front or slightly on the side. A jacket is generally lighter, tighter-fitting, and less insulating than a coat, which is outerwear. Some jackets are fashionable, while others serve as protective clothing. Jackets without sleeves are vests.

Etymology
The word jacket comes from the French word jaquette. The term comes from the Middle French noun jaquet, which refers to a small or lightweight tunic. In Modern French, jaquette is synonymous with jacket. Speakers of American English sometimes informally use the words jacket and coat interchangeably. The word is cognate with Spanish jaco and Italian giacca or giacchetta, first recorded around 1350s. It is ultimately loaned from Arabic shakk (شكّ), which in turn loaned from Aramean/Assyrian and Hebrew shaḳḳ (שַׁקּ).

List of jackets   
 Atilla, a fancy Hungarian shell-jacket or short coat, decorated with braided cord and knots
 Ball jacket, often specified as a baseball jacket or football jacket, a casual jacket with knitted cuffs, collar, and waistband and a zippered front
 Bed jacket, a jacket made from lightweight material designed to be worn in bed
 Blazer, similar to but more casual than a suit jacket; single- or double-breasted of sturdy material, commonly with metal buttons.
 Blouson, a military-style waist-length jacket.
 Bolero, a very short jacket for everyone, originally worn by matadors
 Bomber jacket, a blouson originally designed for US aircrews in leather or nylon.
 Brunswick, a two-piece woman's gown of the mid-eighteenth century.
 Caraco, a woman's jacket of the 18th century.
 Cardigan, a sweater worn like a jacket.
 Chef's jacket
 Chore jacket or chore coat, a jacket made of denim or other robust cloth, with large front pockets, originally a piece of workwear
 Dinner jacket, part of the black-tie dress code of evening formal wear. Also known as a Dinner suit and a Tuxedo.
 Donkey jacket
 Doublet (clothing)
 Down jacket, a quilted jacket filled with down feathers
 Eisenhower jacket, a waist-length, fitted, military-inspired jacket with a waistband based on the World War II British Army's Battle Dress jacket introduced by General Dwight Eisenhower
 Field jacket, a jacket that is worn by soldiers on the battlefield or doing duties in cold weather. The field jacket came about during World War II with the US Army introducing the M-1941 and the M-1943 field jacket and issued the jacket to their troops. The most well-known and the most popular type of military field jacket that is on the market today is the M-1965 or M-65 field jacket which came into US military service in 1965.
 Flak jacket, 20th century armoured vest
 Fleece jacket, a casual jacket made of synthetic wool such as Polar Fleece
 Flight jacket, also known as a bomber jacket
 Gilet, a sleeveless jacket or vest. 
 Hacking jacket
 Harrington jacket, a lightweight waist-length jacket
 Hoodie, a zippered hooded sweatshirt (non zippered can be considered a sweatshirt only)
 Jean jacket or denim jacket, a jacket falling slightly below the waist, usually of denim, with buttoned band cuffs like a shirt and a waistband that can be adjusted by means of buttons.  Also called Levi's jacket (see Levi's)
 Jerkin
 Kilt jacket, one of several styles of traditional Scottish jacket worn with the kilt, including the Argyll jacket, the Prince Charlie jacket, and a type of tweed jacket
 Leather jacket, also known as a motorcycle jacket
 Letter jacket also known as a letterman or varsity jacket
 Mackinaw jacket
 Mess jacket or eton jacket, similar to a tailcoat but cut off just below the waist. Worn as part of mess dress and formerly as the school uniform of boys under 5'4" at Eton College until 1976 and at many other English schools, particularly choir schools
 Motorcycle jacket, a leather jacket, usually black, worn by motorcycle riders; originally to mid-thigh, now usually to a fitted waist
 Nehru jacket
 Norfolk jacket
 Parka
 Peplum jacket, a jacket featuring a short overskirt
 Puffer jacket or Puffa jacket, a type of padded jacket popular in the 1990s
 Rain jacket, a short rain coat
 Reefing jacket or reefer, a type of pea coat
 Riding jacket, part of a riding habit
 Sailor jacket
 Satin jacket, a type of ball jacket made of satin and popular in the 1950s
 Smart jacket, with built-in heating elements on the chest, hands and back. It keeps the wearer warm in cold weather. It comes with special sensors to let the wearer adjust the heat output as per his convenience.
 Smoking jacket
 Spencer, a high-waisted jacket dating to the Regency period
 Sport coat (US) or Sports jacket (UK), a tailored jacket, similar in cut to a suit coat but more utilitarian, originally casual wear for hunting, riding, and other outdoor sports; specific types include a shooting jacket and hacking jacket
 Suit jacket
 Tabard, a loose sleeveless outer garment
 Tunic, a thigh length coat or jacket worn with a wide range of military and civilian uniforms
 Windbreaker (N. American, Japan) or windcheater (UK)
 Tracksuit jacket
 Wamus, also called a "roundabout," a traditional American term for a short jacket.

See also
 Sweater
Sweatshirt
Trousers
Skirts

References

External links 

 
History of clothing (Western fashion)